Horodniceni is a commune located in Suceava County, Romania. It is composed of five villages: Botești, Brădățel, Horodniceni, Mihăiești, and Rotopănești.

Natives
 Marie Cantacuzène

References

Communes in Suceava County
Localities in Western Moldavia